Karlos Nasar (Bulgarian: Карлос Насар; born 12 May 2004) is a Bulgarian male weightlifter. He won the gold medal in the men's 81 kg event at the 2021 World Weightlifting Championships held in Tashkent, Uzbekistan.

Career

World Championships
He competed at the 2021 World Weightlifting Championships in the 81 kg category. At the competition he set the world record in the clean and jerk 208 kg for the 81 kg weight class. He also set the junior and youth world records in the clean and jerk 208 kg and total 374 kg for the 81 kg weight class.

He won the gold medal in the men's 89kg Clean & Jerk event at the 2022 World Weightlifting Championships held in Bogotá, Colombia.

European Championships

In 2021 he competed at the 2021 European Weightlifting Championships in the 81 kg category, winning the silver in the snatch and in the total and the gold medal in the clean & jerk portion with new European record 206 kg ER. It was an epic fight between Antonino Pizzolato and him which Italian won with 1 kg difference in total.

Major results

References

Living people
2004 births
Bulgarian male weightlifters
People from Pleven Province
European Weightlifting Championships medalists
World Weightlifting Championships medalists
Bulgarian people of Lebanese descent
21st-century Bulgarian people